Ronan Pearson (born 4 October 2001) is a British racing driver from Scotland set to compete in the 2023 British Touring Car Championship driving for Bristol Street Motors with EXCELR8 TradePriceCars.com. He was the 2019 Michelin Clio Cup Series champion.

Career

Karting
Pearson competed in club karting in his native Scotland for six years before his car racing debut, competing in cadet karts before moving up to juniors.

Junior Saloon Car Championship
Pearson made his car racing debut in 2016, driving in the Junior Saloon Car Championship for 6 of the 9 rounds. He finished 20th in the overall standings. Returning to the championship for a full season in 2017 with Westbourne Motorsport, he finished 10th in the overall standings, with one podium at the Snetterton round.

Michelin Clio Cup
For 2018, Pearson would step up to the Michelin Clio Cup, driving again for Westbourne Motorsport. He finished on the podium five times throughout the season, also recording two pole positions and four fastest laps. 

He returned to the championship in 2019, continuing with Westbourne Motorsport, where he won the championship.

Mini Challenge UK
In 2020, Pearson moved up to the Mini Challenge UK with Lux Motorsport. With one podium throughout the season, he finished 11th in the overall standings. 

Switching to LDR Performance Tuning for the 2021 season, he finished 8th in the standings, with one podium and one fastest lap.

He continued in the championship for the 2022 season, this time switching to EXCELR8 Motorsport, and becoming a development driver for their BTCC team in the process. He won three races across the season, including one at the opening round at Donington Park, and two at his home round at Knockhill, which together with eight podiums, one pole position and five fastest laps, brought him to 4th place in the overall standings.

He initially signed a contract to compete in the 2023 season with EXCELR8 Motorsport, but would not race after his surprise move to the British Touring Car Championship.

British Touring Car Championship
In November 2022, it was announced that Pearson would compete in the 2023 Mini Challenge UK with EXCELR8. However, after a new sponsorship deal with Macklin Motors, in February 2023 it was announced that he would drive for Bristol Street Motors with EXCELR8 TradePriceCars.com in the 2023 British Touring Car Championship.

Racing record

Racing career summary

References

External links
 

2001 births
Living people
British racing drivers
Scottish racing drivers
British Touring Car Championship drivers
Mini Challenge UK drivers